As the state union of Serbia and Montenegro dissolved following the 2006 Montenegrin independence referendum, newly independent Serbia dealt with the issue of assignment of country codes. This task, which could seem trivial, is made hugely complex by the number of countries in the world having names which begin with the letter S. In September 2006, the proposal of the Serbian government to obtain the code RS (Republic of Serbia) was accepted by ISO.

Summary

Two-letter ISO 3166-1 alpha-2 

This code, used also as Internet TLD, was a major problem with the ISO's assignment of country codes to Serbia. All combinations of S as a first letter and any other letter in word Serbia, or even  (in Serbian), are already taken by other states:

The Government of Serbia made an official request that the alpha-2 code for Serbia should be RS (Republic of Serbia), but there is an ISO recommendation against any reference to the form of government in these codes. RS could also be an abbreviation for the historical name of today's Serbia, Raška or Rascia which would be in full compliance with this rule (see .ch). The proposal, after an initial rejection by ISO, was accepted in September 2006.

There are at least four examples where the rule against inclusion of government form was broken (Democratic Republic of the Congo has the code CD, Federated States of Micronesia has the code FM, Switzerland has the code CH that stems from country's official Latin name , and the Democratic People's Republic of Korea has the code KP, despite the fact that the code KO is available), and Serbia had good arguments for the use of the RS code, because not a single one of the free codes beginning with S can be associated with it. Other solutions could have been "generic" SS or SX, although SS was likely to be avoided for its association with the Nazi . SS was later assigned to South Sudan and SX to Sint Maarten.

As this code is also to be used as Internet top-level domain for the country, there had been rumours of approaching either International Organization for Standardization, United Nations or one of the countries in the list in order to switch the codes.

Negotiating the purchase or usage of the .sj Internet domain reserved for Svalbard and Jan Mayen was not a plausible option as Norway, which administers this (through UNINETT Norid), has a policy of not commercializing or disposing of this domain.

Also, as SB is a historic code for Serbia, it was hinted that the country could pursue talks with Solomon Islands, the current owner of that code. However, it is worth noting that since ISO 3166-1 requires that a code is unused for five years before it can be re-used, this may not be possible even with the consent of the ISO and the previous holder, as users of the standard may object.

Three-letter ISO 3166-1 alpha-3 

A choice between the English mnemonic SER or the Serbian SRB was the main issue with the alpha-3 code. A possible compromise between the two, SBA, was also mentioned. (SRB should be immediately recognizable by speakers of most European languages, including English, though.)

The Institute for Standardization of Serbia, in line with the proposed alpha-2 code (SP), decided that SPA should be the alpha-3 code for Serbia. The logic of this proposal was unclear, since this decision had not been elaborated by the Institute. However, the decision resulted in a public outcry and was amended by the Government of Serbia, which proposed SRB for the alpha-3 code. This was accepted by the ISO in September 2006. SRB is also the International Olympic Committee and FIFA country code for Serbia.

International licence plate code 

Although one would presume that countries take on the shortest code possible (by rule the same as their ISO 3166-1 alpha-2), that is not the case. Thus, the "attractive" SR and SB are available for Serbia, as Suriname uses SME, while the Solomon Islands are identified by SLB.

Ironically, SRB had been advertised by the press as the likely solution — even though the Kingdom of Serbia used SB from 1911 to 1919, when it was replaced by SHS, followed by Y, YU and SCG. Abbreviation S was taken by Sweden the same year, making it unavailable for Serbia, despite being one of the first 17 countries in the world to be assigned this code.

Despite that SB and SR are available for this purpose, official government bodies and the media are still maintaining the claim that the international license plate code for Serbia should (and could only) be its ISO-3166-1 alpha-3 code, SRB.

Country calling code 

Serbia will keep the telephone country calling code previously assigned to Serbia and Montenegro, +381. Following the breakup of the Socialist Federal Republic of Yugoslavia, the country code +38 was divided amongst the newly independent states:

Two other codes from the 38 sequence have also been assigned:

Montenegro was assigned +382 on 6 September 2006. The new code was phased in during 2007.

ISO 4217 

This code is used for national currency, in this case the Serbian dinar. This three-letter code is composed of, by rule, first two letters of the ISO 3166-1 alpha-2 and a third letter is initial of the currency itself: RSD. Exceptions from the rule are made only in the third letter, if that suits the country better — however that is not the case here.

See also 
 ISO 3166-2:RS (current code for Serbia)
 ISO 3166-2:CS (deleted code for Serbia and Montenegro)

Sources

External links 
 

Communications in Serbia
Country codes